Khakeh (also Romanized as Khākeh) is a village in Kenarrudkhaneh Rural District, in the Central District of Golpayegan County, Isfahan Province, Iran. At the 2006 census, its population was 37, in 14 families.

References 

Populated places in Golpayegan County